Attorney General Hamilton may refer to:

Andrew Jackson Hamilton (1815–1875), Attorney General of Texas
Jo Hamilton (politician) (1827–1904), Attorney General of California
Robert Wilson Hamilton (1819–1904), Attorney General of Fiji

See also
General Hamilton (disambiguation)